Ri Yong-ju is an Admiral and politician of the Democratic People's Republic of Korea (North Korea) and a candidate member of the Central Committee of the Workers' Party of Korea. He was member of the 12th convocation of the Supreme People's Assembly. He is currently the commander of the Korean People's Navy.

Biography
After being promoted to Lieutenant General, he served as a delegate to the 12th Supreme People's Assembly in March 2009 as representative of the 548th electoral district. He served as a candidate member of the Central Committee of the Workers' Party of Korea, and in March 2014, as representative of the 13th convocation of the Supreme People's Assembly for the District 449. In December 2011 he participated at the funeral committee which organized the funeral of Kim Jong-il.

In April 2015, he succeeded Kim Myong-sik as the Navy commander. In August, he was promoted to admiral, and in April 2016, he became a member of the Central Committee of the Korean Workers' Party.

References

External links
 Photo of Ri Yong-ju

Members of the Supreme People's Assembly
North Korean generals
Workers' Party of Korea politicians
Admirals
Living people
Year of birth missing (living people)
Korean People's Navy officers